Gérard Prêcheur (born 23 October 1959) is a French professional football manager and former player who is the head coach of Division 1 Féminine club Paris Saint-Germain.

Prêcheur was previously in charge of Lyon and Jiangsu Suning. He was nominated for The Best FIFA Women's Coach in 2016 and 2017.

Managerial career
Prêcheur started his managerial career with Olympique de Valence in 1988. From 2000 to 2014, he worked with French Football Federation for 14 years in different roles including head of women's football section, head coach of under-20 women's team and INF Clairefontaine manager.

In June 2014, Prêcheur was appointed as the head coach of Division 1 Féminine club Lyon. On 1 August 2022, he was announced as the manager of Paris Saint-Germain, replacing Didier Ollé-Nicolle. He signed a contract until June 2023 with an option to extend for one more year.

Honours
Lyon
 Division 1 Féminine: 2014–15, 2015–16, 2016–17
 Coupe de France féminine: 2014–15, 2015–16, 2016–17
 UEFA Women's Champions League: 2015–16, 2016–17

Jiangsu Suning
 Chinese Women's Super League: 2019

References

External links

1959 births
Living people
Olympique Lyonnais Féminin managers
Paris Saint-Germain Féminine managers
French football managers
French footballers
Sportspeople from Nancy, France
French expatriate football managers
Expatriate football managers in China
French expatriate sportspeople in China
Women's association football managers
Footballers from Grand Est
SR Saint-Dié players
AS Montferrand Football players